Matija Pavšič (born 13 November 1979) is a Slovenian rower. He competed in the men's coxless pair event at the 2004 Summer Olympics.

References

1979 births
Living people
Slovenian male rowers
Olympic rowers of Slovenia
Rowers at the 2004 Summer Olympics
Sportspeople from Koper
21st-century Slovenian people